Salusbury Lloyd (died 26 December 1734), of Leadbrook, Flintshire, was a British Whig politician who sat in the House of Commons from 1728 to 1734.

Lloyd was christened John Lloyd. He married, by licence dated 9 May 1695, Letitia Salusbury, heiress to the Salusburys of Leadbrook, Flintshire. He thereby acquired an estate with a considerable electoral interest at Flint, and also changed his first name to Salusbury 

Lloyd rented an estate near Flint and stood with government support for Parliament at Flint Boroughs at the 1727 general election. The head bailiff was Lloyd's tenant and was threatened with eviction if he did not return his landlord, and so there was a double return. Although Lloyds opponent won a large majority, a party vote of the House of Commons awarded the seat to Lloyd, in spite of the evidence. Lloyd voted with the Government on every recorded occasion, except the excise bill, which he opposed. He did not stand again at the 1734 general election.

Lloyd died on 1734. His son predeceased him and he left his property to his daughter Catherine's husband, Thomas Brereton.

References

1734 deaths
Members of the Parliament of Great Britain for Welsh constituencies
British MPs 1727–1734